The Clarks River, named for William Clark of the Lewis and Clark Expedition, is a   tributary of the Tennessee River in the Jackson Purchase region of western Kentucky. 
Below the West Fork Clarks River, the river has a mean annual discharge of 368 cubic feet per second. This figure is obtained by combining the average discharge of the Clarks River at Benton, and the average discharge of the West Fork at Brewers.

Two forks
For the greater part of its length, it consists of two parallel forks of approximately equal size, the East Fork and the West Fork. The East Fork, shown on federal maps as the main stem of the river, begins south of Murray near the community of Puryear in Henry County, Tennessee and is paralleled by the Paducah, Tennessee and Alabama Railroad.

Artifacts
The Clarks River streams from Murray in Calloway County through Benton in Marshall County and ends in Paducah (McCracken County), where the mouth of the river intersects with the Tennessee River just before the Tennessee River joins the Ohio River. This river is full of wildlife and full of water moccasin.  Documented evidence states that many Native American encampments and Indian tribes camped and lived along its banks.  To this day artifacts have been found including spearheads, arrowheads and pottery.

The river is the namesake of Clarks River Road in Paducah.

See also
List of rivers of Kentucky

References

Rivers of Kentucky
Tributaries of the Tennessee River
Rivers of Marshall County, Kentucky
Rivers of McCracken County, Kentucky